In a wiki, document mode is the conventional mode of editing, in which the current version of the page is a coherent and self-contained whole, reflecting only the result of the last update and not any history. The page is simply the current version of the document, hence the name document mode.

In document mode, maintenance of the history is left entirely to the wiki software, as opposed to thread mode, where the history of a discussion is also reflected in the current page.

MediaWiki provides the even-numbered namespaces for document mode, often used for articles and other pages such as policy documents, and for each an odd-numbered namespace for discussion, in thread mode.

External links
MeatBall description of document mode
A discussion of the use of document mode

Wiki concepts